Zelyonyye Prudy is a rural locality (a selo) in Sasykolsky Selsoviet, Kharabalinsky District, Astrakhan Oblast, Russia. The population was 3 as of 2010. There is 1 street.

Geography
Zelyonyye Prudy is located 39 km northwest of Kharabali (the district's administrative centre) by road. Sasykoli is the nearest rural locality.

References

Rural localities in Kharabalinsky District